Naisar (also Romanized as Nā’ī Sar and Na yi Sār; also known as Nāysar and Neysār) is a village in Howmeh Rural District, in the Central District of Sanandaj County, Kurdistan Province, Iran. At the 2006 census, its population was 12,480, in 3,121 families. The village is populated by Kurds.

References 

Towns and villages in Sanandaj County
Kurdish settlements in Kurdistan Province